William Patrick Jeffries (born 19 September 1945) is a former New Zealand politician of the Labour Party. He was elected as the Member of Parliament for Heretaunga and served as Minister of Transport and Minister of Justice.

Biography

Early life and career
Jeffries was born in Wellington in 1945 and he was educated at St Patrick's College. He attended Victoria University and graduated with a Bachelor of Laws, after which he became a lawyer at his brother's legal firm. Later he left New Zealand to work in the United Kingdom, before returning to Wellington and establishing his own law firm.

He was an active athlete in his youth, playing both tennis and rugby. Jeffries married and had six children.

Political career

Jeffries was a member of the Wellington City Council from 1974 until 1980. From 1977 to 1980 he was leader of the Labour caucus on the council; he was the youngest ever leader. Wellington Mayor Sir Michael Fowler later described Jeffries as an "extremely good" councillor. His brother John was previously also a councillor and Deputy Mayor to Sir Frank Kitts.

In 1978 Jeffries unsuccessfully contested the seat of Miramar for the Labour Party.

He represented the Heretaunga electorate from 1981 to 1990, when he was defeated by National candidate Peter McCardle in a swing against Labour. He was undersecretary to the Minister of Transport in 1986 and also to the Minister of Works, and chairman of a parliamentary committee on road safety in 1987. In April 1988 he was appointed chairman of the National Roads Board. He was Minister of Justice from 1989 to 1990 in the Fourth Labour Government.

Lombard Finance convictions
On 24 February 2012 Jeffries was convicted, along with fellow former Justice Minister Sir Douglas Graham and two other men, of breaching the Securities Act by making untrue statements to investors in his capacity as a director of Lombard Finance. Justice Robert Dobson wrote, "I am satisfied that the accused genuinely believed in the accuracy and adequacy of the ... documents", but that the offences were ones of strict liability so there was no need for "any form of mental intent to distribute documents that were false or misleading". Jeffries was sentenced to 400 hours' community service. The Court of Appeal dismissed his appeal against conviction and increased his sentence to eight months' home detention and 250 hours' community work, but the Supreme Court restored the original sentence. Retired Court of Appeal judge Sir Edmund Thomas described his convictions as a "grievous miscarriage of justice", saying of the crucial piece of evidence that "you would never ever convict a dog on the basis of the schedule".

Notes

References

|-

1945 births
People educated at St. Patrick's College, Wellington
Victoria University of Wellington alumni
New Zealand Labour Party MPs
Members of the Cabinet of New Zealand
Living people
New Zealand MPs for Hutt Valley electorates
Members of the New Zealand House of Representatives
Unsuccessful candidates in the 1990 New Zealand general election
Wellington City Councillors
New Zealand politicians convicted of crimes
Justice ministers of New Zealand